Wishcycling is the disposal of consumer waste in a recycle bin in hopes of it being recycled, whereas it cannot or is unlikely to be recycled. Wishcycling occurs because people are unfamiliar with what can be recycled or they believe the item they dispose of for recycling can be made into a useful item.  With recycling programs differing by jurisdiction and accepting different types of items, this can lead to confusion as to what types of items are accepted. 

Wishcycling can be harmful to the recycling process of items that can actually be recycled in multiple ways. Recycling trucks can be overloaded. The unwanted items take up the time and effort of workers who handle recyclables to separate from the true recyclables. The non-recyclable items can contaminate the mills that handle recyclable goods, sometimes requiring entire batches of recyclables to be thrown away. In some cases, they can damage the recycle mills. Nearly one-fifth of all recyclables are contaminated by wishcycling.

Commonly ‘wishcycled’ objects include Christmas trees, wrapping paper, gift bags, pizza boxes, clementine boxes, clothing, sheets, ink cartridges, soiled paper products, and styrofoam.

See also
 Waste management

References

External links
 What is wishcycling?
 What is wishcycling and why does it matter?

 Recycling
 Waste management